James Pattison may refer to:
 Jim Pattison (James Allen Pattison, born 1928), Canadian business magnate
 Jimmy Pattison (baseball) (James Wells Pattison, 1908–1991), Major League pitcher
 James Pattison (banker), Governor of the Bank of England
 James Pattison (British Army officer) (1723–1805), Royal Artillery officer
 James Pattison (Irish politician) (1886–1963), Labour party politician
 James Pattison (London MP) (1794–1849), Liberal Party politician
 James Grant Pattison (1862–1946), Australian journalist and author
 James Pattison (1828 ship), merchant sailing ship

See also
 James Pattison Cockburn (1779–1847), British author and artist

 James Pattison Walker (1823–1906), British surgeon

Pattison, James